Truls Kristiansen (born 5 April 1964) is a Norwegian former ice hockey player. He was born in Asker, Norway and played for the club IF Frisk Asker. He played for the Norwegian national ice hockey team at the 1988 Winter Olympics.

References

External links

1964 births
Frisk Asker Ishockey players
Ice hockey players at the 1988 Winter Olympics
Living people
Norwegian ice hockey players
Olympic ice hockey players of Norway
People from Asker
Sportspeople from Viken (county)